Vincenz is a given name. Notable people with the name include:

Vincenz Armann (1599–1649), Flemish or Dutch landscape painter
Vincenz Czerny (1842–1916), German Bohemian surgeon
Vincenz Fettmilch (died 1616), grocer and gingerbread baker who led the Fettmilch uprising
Vincenz Fischer (born 1729), historical painter and professor of architecture at the Academy of Vienna
Vincenz Fohmann (1794–1837), German-Belgian anatomist born
Vincenz Fux (1606–1659), Austrian musician and composer
Vincenz Grimm (1800–1872), Hungarian chess master
Vincenz Hasak (born 1812), Catholic historian
Vincenz Hruby (1856–1917), Czech chess master
Vincenz Hundhausen (1878–1955), German-language professor at Peking University
Vincenz Kollar (1797–1860), Austrian entomologist who specialised in Diptera
Julius Vincenz von Krombholz (1782–1843), physician and mycologist
Vincenz Lachner (1811–1893), German composer and conductor
Vincenz Liechtenstein (1950–2008), Austrian politician (ÖVP)
Vincenz Mayer (born 1990), German professional ice hockey player
Vincenz Eduard Milde (1777–1853), Prince-Archbishop of Vienna
Vincenz Müller (1894–1961), German military officer and general
Vincenz Priessnitz (1799–1851), peasant farmer considered the founder of modern hydrotherapy
Ignaz Vincenz Zingerle (1825–1892), Austrian poet and scholar

See also
Lilli Vincenz, lesbian activist, member of the Mattachine Society of Washington
Vincenzi
Vincenzo

German masculine given names